Rajnath Singh (born 10 July 1951) is an Indian politician serving as the Defence Minister of India. He is currently the Deputy Leader of the House Lok Sabha. He is the former President of Bharatiya Janata Party. He has previously served as the Chief Minister of Uttar Pradesh and as a Cabinet Minister in the Vajpayee Government. He was the Home Minister in the First Modi Ministry. He has also served as the President of the BJP twice i.e. 2005 to 2009 and 2013 to 2014. He is a veteran leader of the BJP who started his career as a RSS Swayamsevak. He is an advocate of the party's Hindutva ideology. He has also served the party in the Uttar Pradesh state from where he started his political career as a youth leader. He was also the minister of Road Transport and Highways and Agriculture under Prime ministership of Atal Bihari Vajpayee.

He has been Member of parliament, Lok Sabha two times from Lucknow and once from Ghaziabad. He was also active in State Politics and remained MLA from Haidergarh (assembly constituency) twice, being Chief minister.

Early life
Rajnath Singh was born in Bhabhaura village of Chandauli district, Uttar Pradesh in a Rajput family to father Ram Badan Singh and mother Gujarati Devi. He was born into a family of farmers. He received his primary education from a local school of his village and went on to secure a master's degree in physics, acquiring first division results from the Gorakhpur University. From childhood he was inspired by the ideology of Rashtriya Swayamsevak Sangh. He worked as a lecturer of Physics at K.B. Post-Graduate College Mirzapur, UP. He has also one brother, Jaipal Singh.

Early political career

Entry into politics 
Singh had been associated with the Rashtriya Swayamsevak Sangh since 1964, at the age of 13 and remained connected with the organisation. He also became Shakha Karyavah (General Secretary) of Mirzapur in the year 1972. After 2 years in the year 1974, he joined the politics. Between 1969 and 1971 he was the organizational secretary of the Akhil Bharatiya Vidyarthi Parishad (the student wing of the RSS) in Gorakhpur. He became the general secretary of the RSS's Mirzapur branch in 1972. In 1974, he was appointed secretary for the Mirzapur unit of the Bharatiya Jana Sangh, predecessor of Bharatiya Janata Party. In 1975, aged 24, Singh was appointed District President of the Jana Sangh.

JP Movement and Emergency 
In the 1970s, Singh was influenced by the JP Movement of Jayaprakash Narayan. He was also arrested in the year 1975 during the state of National Emergency for associating with JP Movement and was detained for a time period of 2 years.

Entry into electoral politics 
After being released from jail, Singh joined the Janata Party founded by Jayprakash Narayan and contested legislative assembly elections from Mirzapur in 1977. He successfully fought the election and was elected as a Member of Legislative Assembly from Mirzapur.

Rise within BJP 
At that time he gained the popularity in State (politics) and then joined BJP in the year 1980 and was one of the initial members of the Party. He became the State President of the BJP youth wing in 1984, the National general secretary in 1986 and the National President in 1988. He was also elected into the Uttar Pradesh Legislative Council.

Early ministerial roles

Education Minister (1991–1992) 
In 1991, when Bharatiya Janata Party made its government first time in Uttar Pradesh, he was appointed as the Education Minister. He remained minister for a tenure of two years. Major highlights of his tenure as Education Minister included Anti-Copying Act, 1992, which made copying a non-bailable offence, modernising science texts and incorporating vedic mathematics into the syllabus.

Anti-Copying Act, 1992 

Singh helped push the controversial Anti-Copying Act in response to perceived widespread cheating in schools and colleges in Uttar Pradesh. After the fall of Kalyan Singh government in the year 1992, when Mulayam Singh Yadav became the Chief Minister of Uttar Pradesh, heading Bahujan Samaj Party in the year 1993 he repealed the Act.

Modernising education system 
In 1991, he rewrote history texts and incorporated Vedic Mathematics into the syllabus. He was a loyal man of RSS, which is a culturalist organisation and was considered as a move by the Sangh. He also focused to revive mother tongue languages instead of foreign languages, but also stated and appreciated knowledge of modern languages.

Union Transport Minister (1999–2000) 
In April 1994, he was elected into the Rajya Sabha (Upper House of the Parliament) and he became involved with the Advisory committee on Industry (1994–96), Consultative Committee for the Ministry of Agriculture, Business Advisory Committee, House Committee and the Committee on Human Resource Development. On 25 March 1997, he became the President of the BJP's unit in Uttar Pradesh and in 1999 he became the Union Cabinet Minister for Surface Transport.

Chief Minister of Uttar Pradesh (2000–02) 
In 2000, he became Chief Minister of Uttar Pradesh and was twice elected as MLA from Haidergarh in 2001 and 2002. He was preceded by Ram Prakash Gupta as the Chief Minister and succeeded the President rule, later after Mayawati became the Chief Minister of Uttar Pradesh. At that time he was appointed as the Chief minister because from very long time he had made an image among people due to his ground level effect from long back the times of 1970's in the JP Movement and was also the Education Minister in Kalyan Singh ministry and was also active in the State Politics. At that time there also many leaders in BJP from Uttar Pradesh, but very few had a strong support at the ground level. He was at that time very much close to Atal Bihari Vajpayee and had a very clean image among the people of the State. He also portrayed as a leader of Rajputs (Thakur) who are a powerful community in the state and were also an ardent votebank of the party like Bhairon Singh Shekhawat. Even unlike, L. K. Advani and Kalyan Singh, he was not a leader of Firebrand Hindutva ideology and was a very soft-spoken person.

Notable reforms as chief minister 
While being the Chief Minister of Uttar Pradesh, had accused Samajwadi Party of providing jobs to a certain community only. Singh had said that discrimination in job opportunities should end in the state. He tried to rationalise the reservation structure in government jobs by introducing the most Backward Classes among the OBC and SC, so that the benefit of reservation can reach the lowest status of Society.

After being the Chief Minister of Uttar Pradesh in the year 2000, the first thing on which Singh focused was the Law and Order in the State. At that time Uttar Pradesh was at the top of the list of States of India in Crime and the Law and Order lacked a lot in the State. Whether he had done good work for the Law Reforms, but it was not applicable on Ground levels and after 2002 Gujarat riots a large portion of public lose faith on BJP.

On 7 February 2001, Singh inaugurated the DND Flyway which connects Delhi to Noida.

Resignation 
In the year 2002, he resigned from the position of Chief Minister of U.P. within the time of 2 years because at that time during the ground test, the BJP Government was at minority status. Because of the following reason there was imposition of President's rule in the State, then after that in the 14th Legislative Assembly, Mayawati became the Chief Minister for the 3rd time.

Rise in national politics

Union Agriculture Minister (2003–04) 
In 2003, Singh was appointed as the Minister of Agriculture and subsequently for Food Processing in the NDA Government led by Atal Bihari Vajpayee, and was faced with the difficult task of maintaining one of the most volatile areas of India's economy. During this period he initiated a few epoch-making projects including the Kisan Call Centre and Farm Income Insurance Scheme. He brought down interest rates on Agriculture loans and also established Farmer Commission and initiated Farms Income Insurance Scheme.

National President of the BJP

First time (2005–2009) 

After the BJP lost power in the 2004 general elections, it was forced to sit in the Opposition. After the resignation of prominent figure Lal Krishna Advani due to controversial statements over Muhammad Ali Jinnah, and the murder of strategist Pramod Mahajan, Singh sought to rebuild the party by focusing on the most basic Hindutva ideologies. He announced his position of "no compromise" in relation to the building of a Ram Temple in Ayodhya at any cost and commended the rule of Vajpayee as Prime Minister, pointing towards all the developments the NDA made for the ordinary people of India. He also criticised the role of the English language in India, claiming that most of Indian population is unable to participate in Indian economy and cultural discourse due to extreme preferences shown to English at the expense of native languages. Singh also suspended Jaswant Singh from the party for praising Jinnah and disrespecting the policies of Jawaharlal Nehru, which also led to a wave of controversies as Jaswant Singh was a very senior leader of the party.  Singh had held many positions for the RSS and the BJP, including serving as the Chief Minister of Uttar Pradesh and the President of the BJP's youth wing. He advocated a return to a Hindutva platform. Singh resigned after the NDA lost the 2009 Indian general election.

He became the BJP National President on 31 December 2005, a post he held till 19 December 2009. In May 2009, he was elected MP from Ghaziabad in Uttar Pradesh.

Second time (2013–2014) 
On 24 January 2013, following the resignation of Nitin Gadkari due to corruption charges, Singh was re-elected as the BJP's National President.

Singh is on record shortly after the law Section 377 of the Indian Penal Code was re-instated in 2013, claiming that his party is "unambiguously" in favour of the law, also claiming that "We will state (at an all-party meeting if it is called) that we support Section 377 because we believe that homosexuality is an unnatural act and cannot be supported." Singh was elected president for his second term after Gadkari stepped down in 2013. Singh played a large role in the BJP's campaign for the 2014 Indian general election, including declaring Narendra Modi the party's Prime Ministerial candidate despite opposition from within the BJP. After the party's landslide victory, Singh resigned the party presidency to assume the position of Home Minister.

He contested the 2014 Lok Sabha elections from Lucknow constituency and was subsequently elected as a Member of the Parliament.

Union Home Minister (2014–19) 

He was appointed the Union Minister of Home Affairs in the Narendra Modi government and was sworn in on 26 May 2014. At that time he was the former president of the party and was the one who named Narendra Modi as the Prime Minister Candidate for the party. After the win of the party in 2014 Lok Sabha Election he took over the position from Sushilkumar Shinde as the Minister of Home Affairs (India) from the year 2014–2019. And he is also the Current Deputy Leader of Lok Sabha from the year 2019.

Controversy over JNU incident 
He triggered controversy amid the protests over the police action at Jawaharlal Nehru University (JNU), on 14 February 2016, claiming that the "JNU incident" was supported by Lashkar-e-Taiba chief Hafiz Saeed. He gave the statement when there was an Anti-National speeches in the JNU Delhi over the anniversary of hanging of Kashmiri Separist Maqbool Bhat and Afzal Guru on 9 February 2016. After the statement there was also a vast protest against Singh and after the arrests of Umar Khalid and Kanhaiya Kumar, he made meeting with many left leaders. He also assured the citizens that what he said was right and he also people assurance of not tolerating the Anti-National Acts. Singh at that time also appointed an SIT for the investigation of the matter.

In May 2016, he claimed that infiltration from Pakistan declined by 52% in a period of two years.

Bharat Ke Veer App 
On 9 April 2017, he launched Bharat Ke Veer Web portal and Application with Bollywood actor Akshay Kumar. This was an initiative taken by him for the welfare of Martyrs' family. Bharat Ke Veer is a fund-raising initiative by the Ministry of Home Affairs, Government of India on behalf of members of the Indian paramilitary Forces. Singh himself praised the app and at that time was the first donor of the app.

An official anthem was launched on 20 January 2018 for the cause 'Bharat Ke Veer' by him along with film star Akshay Kumar, and other ministers Kiren Rijiju, Hansraj Ahir.

Doklam matter 

Doklam is a disputed territory between Bhutan and China since the 1950s and when China unilaterally claimed Doklam as its own territory by trying to build a road in the disputed area, the Indian army stepped-in on behalf of Bhutan which created tensions between the Indian Army and Liberation Army of China. Over the matter Singh assured Public to solve the matter and he had talks with officials of the Chinese Communist Party over relations between the two countries. Though the matter was between the Bhutan and China, but when Bhutan sought help from India, then India also indulged in the matter. Singh and Prime Minister Narendra Modi also openely opposed the matter and came in the support of Bhutan. Later, the tension solved at large extent. The main reason was also that Singh also threatened China to stop its import and start of Trade War. On 9 October 2017 China announced that it was ready to maintain peace at frontiers with India reacting to Indian Defence Minister Nirmala Sitharaman and Rajnath Singh visit to Nathu La.

Commissioning of Bastariya Battalion 
On 21 May 2018, he commissioned Bastariya Battalion. As Union Home Minister, Rajnath Singh attended the passing out parade of 241 Bastariya Battalion of CRPF in Ambikapur, Chhattisgarh on 21 May 2018.

Union Defence Minister (2019–present)

Singh became the Defence minister of India on 31 May 2019. Singh was given Ministry of Defence (India) after Amit Shah was given the Ministry of Home Affairs (India). As Union Defence Minister now, Singh has indicated a subtle shift in India's strategic vision. Among the challenges that the Defence Minister is expected to address are the ever-increasing requirements of India's forces, including increased budgetary requirements, especially in the light of an unstable neighbourhood.

After being Defence Minister he had focused mainly on increasing the defence budget of the nation and has focused on decreasing the import of weapons from other nations and making the nation an arms exporter with an arms industry. He also stated that:

Rafale fighter plane 

Dassault Rafale is a fighter plane of French origin whose deal was signed by then Minister of Defence (India), Manohar Parrikar in 2016 to increase the strength of the Indian Air Force. The Government of India had signed to buy 126 fighter jets costing $30 billion.

The planes were received during his tenure as the Defence Minister of India. Though that was also a very controversial issue, Singh received and completed the deal after becoming Minister of Defence of India and the Indian Air Force received its first Dassault Rafale on 8 October 2019, when he personally went to France to receive it. The first fleet of 5 fighter jets landed at Ambala Air Force Station.

India received the second fleet of Rafale jets on 29 July 2020. Singh said that "Those wanting to threaten India's territorial Integrity should be aware of India's new capability."

Indo-China border tension 
Since May 2020, there has been tension between the Security forces of India and China over the border region of Ladakh. This situation has seen tension increase as China has put pressure on India.  Singh met with officials of the Indian Army and also visited the Ladakh Range. He also met with the Chief of the Defence Staff General Bipin Rawat, CNS Admiral Karambir Singh and COAS General Manoj Mukund Naravane to discuss about the situation. After the martyrdom of 20 Indian soldiers during the 2020 China–India skirmishes in Galwan Valley, Singh met with the Indian soldiers. He also said that he can't guarantee to what extent the tension would go. Later the situation was handled.

Then again from the date of 30 August 2020, People's Liberation Army started the controversy of Ladakh area by putting a large number of troops over the controversial area and over this Chinese Communist Party leader Yang Jiechi and People's Liberation Army General Wei stated that the matter was started by the Indian Armed Forces. Chinese General Wei Fenghe and his Indian counterpart Singh held a talk, on 4 September in Moscow, on the sidelines of a Shanghai Cooperation Organisation meeting. On 10 September, the foreign affairs ministers of China and India met in Moscow. Five points were agreed upon in a joint statement, including new CBMs between the two countries. On 21 September, the sixth commander-level meeting took place at Chushul-Moldo BPM. The Indian delegation consisted of Lt Gen Harinder Singh, Lt Gen P G K Menon, two major generals, four brigadiers and other officers. The chief of the Indo-Tibetan Border Police was also a part of the delegation. During this meeting, for the first time, a Ministry of External Affairs representative from the Indian side was also present. Following the 14–hour talks, a joint statement was released, which included both sides have agreed to "stop sending more troops to the frontlines.

After the news of the situation became known, Singh assured citizens that the situation is under control and that there is nothing to be worried about. Singh also stated that fake news and rumours were being spread. He also admitted that the Chinese Army has tried to cross the LAC.

Agnipath Scheme 

The Defence Ministry introduced a revolutionary army recruitment scheme called Agnipath (Agneepatha), for recruitment of soldiers under the rank of commissioned officers. The recruitment was pursued for all the three forces, and the selected candidates were termed as "Agniveers". This plan is a four year termed enroll to candidates aging between 18 - 24 of age. Various protests and oppositions were held, against the scheme, questioning about the future of the candidates, procedure and other standards. Railways were set on fire and suffered losses in Bihar, Telangana and West Bengal; the opposition also called it as an RSS agenda based scheme. The Ministry called it a long pending reform, in the defence field to lower the average of the total military age. Further the Delhi High Court also stated that it finds no reason to interfere in the process and the government has brought this "In national Interest" of the country.

Military exercises 
 He virtually inaugurated the four-day Indo-Pacific Military Health Exchange (IPMHE) conference.

Positions and offices

Offices held

Positions held

Personal life 
He married Savitri Singh on 5 June 1971, with whom he has two sons and a daughter. His son Pankaj Singh is a politician and Member of the Legislative Assembly from Noida, Uttar Pradesh from BJP. Singh is a devout Hindu and a religious man and is known for soft-spoken behaviour.

See also
 Narendra Modi
 Amit Shah
 Yogi Adityanath
 China–India relations

References

Citations

Bibliography

External links 

1951 births
India MPs 2009–2014
Defence Ministers of India
India MPs 2014–2019
Agriculture Ministers of India
Bharatiya Janata Party politicians from Uttar Pradesh
Chief ministers from Bharatiya Janata Party
Chief Ministers of Uttar Pradesh
Deen Dayal Upadhyay Gorakhpur University alumni
Living people
Lok Sabha members from Uttar Pradesh
Ministers of Internal Affairs of India
Narendra Modi ministry
Presidents of Bharatiya Janata Party
Rajya Sabha members from Uttar Pradesh
Uttar Pradesh MLAs 1977–1980
Uttar Pradesh MLAs 1997–2002
People from Chandauli district
India MPs 2019–present
Politicians from Varanasi
Politicians from Ghaziabad
Politicians from Lucknow
Janata Party politicians
National Democratic Alliance candidates in the 2019 Indian general election
Rashtriya Swayamsevak Sangh members
National Democratic Alliance candidates in the 2014 Indian general election
Bharatiya Jana Sangh politicians
Candidates in the 2014 Indian general election
Candidates in the 2019 Indian general election
Indian anti-communists
Hindu nationalists
Indian Hindus